V/Vm is the experimental music and sound collage project of Leyland James Kirby, from Stockport, England. Although starting out mainly in the style of noise music, Kirby is also a composer of original electronic music and remixes. His vast output is released primarily on his own V/Vm Test Records label. Alongside the work of the V/Vm project, James Kirby also recorded as The Caretaker. He currently resides in Kraków.

History
Since 1996 there have been numerous releases by V/Vm on a host of labels and featuring the work of a number of musicians. Early releases were often electronic in nature, including a critically acclaimed split 12" release on Fat Cat Records. In 1999, V/Vm also released a recording of pigs feeding at a pig farm in the North West of England to the horror of many reviewers who mistook the sound of feeding pigs for that of pigs being killed.

Around the time of this release, V/Vm appeared on the cover of The Wire (October 1998, issue 176). Under the banner "Harder! Faster! Louder!" the article explored a developing scene which also included Alec Empire, DJ Speedranch, Diskono, and Fat Cat Records.

The late 1990s saw a distinct shift for V/Vm, into more hacked-up, remixed pop music, repackaged crudely and released in a manner which ignored copyright. At this time V/Vm was in conversation with the artists spearheading the bootleg and mashup (a.k.a. bastard pop) genres. This work culminated in 2000 with V/Vm achieving Single of the Week in the NME for the reworking of the Chris de Burgh hit "The Lady in Red". Also around this time, Sick Love was released; it featured a number of classic love songs reprocessed to become only faintly recognisable.

For a time V/Vm continued to hack many artists and audio styles. In 2003, however, lawyers challenged V/Vm after he re-released "Relax", the seminal 1983 hit by Frankie Goes to Hollywood. In a reproduction of the original release, a double L P, a 7-inch picture disc, and a CD single were released, each featuring numerous remixes of "Relax." Within weeks of the release V/Vm received legal threats and in the end was forced to legally withdraw the release from sale.

Whereas V/Vm is best known for "hacking" other artists' works, he has also substantial original recorded output, including a some recordings made in an improvisational style with electronics. Examples of non-sample-based audio exist throughout V/Vm's output, including many electronic and noise-based compositions. His music and performance style is at times critical of other artists, such as Carl Cox. V/Vm was accused of scamming the Fat Cat Records label by impersonating minimal glitch artist Pole, finally confirmed in a talk alongside Pole at Unsound Festival 2012 in Kraków, Poland. V/Vm also brought back Belgian new beat, creating a microsite and releasing two twelve-inch records and a CD featuring new audio made in this electronic style.

The V/Vm live show is often disturbing and has occasionally resulted in serious injury to the artist, most notably in 2006 in Tienen, when V/Vm dislocated a kneecap while performing there. V/Vm has played globally, embarking on tours of America, Australia, Europe, and playing festivals such as Roskilde in Denmark, ZXZW in the Netherlands and Sónar in Barcelona.

V/Vm Test Records
V/Vm runs the V/Vm Test Records label, which releases records from About This Product, Goodiepal, Jansky Noise, and Fast Lady, among many others. The label has been at the forefront in giving away free audio in the form of unrestrictive MP3 downloads through its website and via his new online label Vuzkid and associated microsites.

V/Vm 365 and current projects
In 2005 V/Vm recorded a remix of the Alphaville hit "Forever Young", which was to be used on a worldwide advertising campaign for Sony. The advert was shot but pulled at the last minute due a dispute at the TBWA ad agency. The video was leaked to the Internet.

V/Vm spent all of 2006 on the V/Vm 365 project. "The idea is basically to create and upload free audio for one whole year and leave a massive big mess behind, warts and all, for you to digest as you see fit." This involved producing 603 audio tracks and six video tracks, with a total running time of 52 hours, 3 minutes and 57 seconds. Each day one or more audio pieces were uploaded along with text and a picture for the day.

In 2007 V/Vm received an honorary mention for his work as The Caretaker at the ARS Technica 2007 awards. He was also included in an exhibition in Madrid entitled "Ruidos, Silencios y la Transgresion Mordaz. De Fluxus al techno-noise"; the exhibit featured V/Vm video and artwork by V/Vm, Fluxus artists (Nam June Paik, Philip Corner, Wolf Vostell), and other contemporary artists and musicians (Ultra-red).

Discography

Selected releases
Uplink Data Transmissions – V/Vm Test (1996)
Machines – V/Vm Test (1997)
Fat Cat Split 12-inch – Fat Cat Records (1997)
Pig – V/Vm Test (1999)
Auraloffalwaffle – V/Vm Test (1999)
Lady in Red/All Night Long – V/Vm Test (2000)
Sick Love – V/Vm Test (2000)
Masters of the Absurd – V/Vm Test (2000)
Snooker Loopy – V/Vm Test (2001)
Helpaphextwin – V/Vm Test (2003)
The Missing Symphony – V/Vm Test (2003)
Stigma – V/Vm Test (2004)
Sabam – The Sound of Belgium '89 – V/Vm Test (2006)
White Death – V/Vm Test (2006)
Vvmt365 – Daily Audio Downloads – V/Vm Test (2006)
The Death of Rave – V/Vm Test (2006)

Compilation appearances
"Cha-ha Meat Skran-r The 15lb. Turkey" on Brain in the Wire
"Engulfer" on Brainwaves (2006)
"Female Pig Herder" on Split Series 1–8

Discogs has the most comprehensive release overview of V/Vm Test Records and V/Vm

References

Noise musical groups
English experimental musicians
Musicians from Manchester
Music in the Metropolitan Borough of Stockport
People from Stockport
Living people
1974 births